George Dormer (October 11, 1838 – June 24, 1875) was a Canadian lawyer and political figure. He represented Victoria South in the House of Commons of Canada as a Conservative member from 1872 to 1874.

He was born in Kingston, Upper Canada, the son of James Dormer, a Kingston physician, and Mary Pengelly. He was educated at Laval University and Toronto University. In 1859, he married Sarah Marah. He studied law with John A. Macdonald and was called to the bar in 1872. He practised law in Lindsay. Dormer served as mayor of Lindsay from 1871 to 1872. He died there at the age of 36.

References 

1838 births
1875 deaths
Conservative Party of Canada (1867–1942) MPs
Members of the House of Commons of Canada from Ontario
Mayors of places in Ontario